Bedri Hamza (born 8 November 1963) is a politician and administrator in Kosovo. He has been the Republic of Kosovo's finance minister on two occasions, has served three terms in the Assembly of the Republic of Kosovo, was governor of the Central Bank of Kosovo from 2013 to 2017, and is the current mayor of Mitrovica (South Mitrovica). Hamza is a prominent member of the Democratic Party of Kosovo (Partia Demokratike e Kosovës, PDK).

Early life and career
Hamza was born in the village of Klina e Epërme in the municipality of Skenderaj (Serbian: Srbica), in what was then the Autonomous Province of Kosovo and Metohija in the Socialist Republic of Serbia, Socialist Federal Republic of Yugoslavia. He graduated from the University of Pristina Faculty of Economics in 1987 and later received a master's degree from the post-1999 institution on the topic, "Problems of improving the fiscal system of the Republic of Kosovo." He has taken doctoral studies at the University of Tirana in Albania.

Hamza worked at Trepča Lead Metallurgy in Mitrovica from 1987 to 1990 as head of accounting and finance. He worked in the private sector from 1990 to 1998 and led the directorate of public services for Mitrovica's municipal assembly from 2000 to 2003.

Politician and administrator
Hamza was a candidate on the PDK's electoral list for Mitrovica in the 2002 Kosovan local elections. Online sources do not indicate if he served in the local assembly afterward.

He appeared in the eighty-first position on the PDK's list in the 2004 Kosovan parliamentary election, which was held under open list proportional representation. The list won thirty seats, and he did not serve in the sitting of the assembly that followed. The PDK served in opposition from 2004 to 2008, and Hamza was a member of the party's shadow cabinet with responsibility for finance and economy. In 2006, he was a member of Kosovo's delegation to Vienna for discussions with the Republic of Serbia on economic issues.

Deputy minister (2008–11)
Hamza was given the fifty-fifth position on the PDK's list in the 2007 parliamentary election and finished in fortieth place among the party's candidates. The list won thirty-seven mandates; he was not elected, and, due to a requirement that one-third of mandates be reserved for female candidates, he was not immediately in line for a replacement seat.

The PDK and the rival Democratic League of Kosovo (Lidhja Demokratike e Kosovës, LDK) formed a coalition government after the 2007 election. In January 2008, Hamza was designated as Kosovo's deputy minister of economy and finance in the new government. In June of the same year, he and Albanian economy, trade and energy minister Genc Ruli announced an agreement on cooperation for electrical power. Later in the same year, he announced that Kosovo's government would not allow its borders to operate on United Nations Interim Administration Mission in Kosovo (UNMIK} regulations.

Hamza said in a 2009 interview that investment in energy, roads, and private sector were necessary strategic steps to boost economic growth in Kosovo. He added that years of high growth would be needed to address issues of endemic poverty, saying, "To reduce poverty and unemployment we need to have economic growth of more than eight percent for the next six or seven years."

He had the opportunity to enter the Kosovo assembly in March 2010 but instead continued to serve as a deputy minister. He would not have been able to hold both positions simultaneously under a dual mandate.

Finance minister (first time: 2011–13)
The PDK–LDK coalition fell apart in late 2010, and new elections were held in late 2010. Hamza was again included on the PDK's electoral list and finished eleventh among the party's candidates; the PDK won thirty-four seats and he was elected to the assembly. His first term as a legislator as brief; the PDK formed government after the election, and Hamza was appointed as Kosovo's finance minister on the same day as the assembly convened.

As minister, Hamza pursued a privatization strategy for Kosovo Telecom. In April 2011, he signed an agreement with Zoran Stavreski, the finance minister of Macedonia (now North Macedonia), on double taxation avoidance and protection from tax evasion. The following year, he signed an agreement with Turkish finance minister Mehmet Şimşek to collaborate on mutual tax relations.

Governor of the Central Bank of Kosovo (2013–17)
Hamza was appointed as governor of the Central Bank of Kosovo on 14 March 2013. His appointment was controversial; opposition parties argued that the appointment of a leading PDK official to the role was an attack on the bank's independence. This notwithstanding, he served in the role for the next four years.

Finance minister (second time: 2017–20)
Hamza resigned as governor of the central bank on 13 September 2017 in order to return to the office of finance minister. In February 2018, he helped to facilitate a European Union grant of 38.5 million Euros for the upgrading of Kosovo's railway system.

In 2018, the Republic of Kosovo introduced a punitive one hundred per cent tariff on goods from Serbia, as a means of pressuring Serbia for a comprehensive deal that would include recognition of Kosovo as an independent country. In January 2019, Hamza said that Serbia's revenues had fallen by eighty million Euros as a result of this arrangement. He also said that the Republic of Kosovo was working to prevent what it identified as smuggling from Serbia.

Parliamentarian (2019–2021)
Hamza received the eighth position on the PDK's list in the 2019 Kosovan parliamentary election, finished in sixth place among the party's candidates, and was elected to a second term in the assembly when the list won twenty-four seats. The PDK served in opposition in the parliament that followed. During this term, Hamza was head of the PDK's parliamentary group, the chair of the public finance oversight committee, and a member of the committee on budget and transfers.

He was promoted to the fourth position on the PDK list in the 2021 parliamentary election, finished in third place, and was re-elected when the list won nineteen seats. The party continued to serve in opposition. Hamza was a deputy speaker in the assembly in 2021.

Mayor of Mitrovica (2021–present)
Hamza was elected as mayor of Mitrovica in the 2021 Kosovan local elections, defeating incumbent Agim Bahtiri of Vetëvendosje in the first round of voting. By virtue of having won this position, he resigned from parliament on 1 November 2021.

Electoral record

Local

Notes

References

1963 births
Living people
Kosovo Albanians
People from Skenderaj
Politicians from Mitrovica, Kosovo
Finance ministers of Kosovo
Members of the Assembly of the Republic of Kosovo
Mayors of places in Kosovo
Democratic Party of Kosovo politicians